Mary Carey may refer to:

Mary Boleyn (c. 1499/1500 – 1543), married name Mary Carey, sister to Queen Anne and mistress of Henry VIII of England and Francis I of France
Mary Carey, Lady Carey (c. 1609 – c. 1680), née Jackson
Mary Carey (baseball) (1925–1977), All-American Girls Professional Baseball League player
Mary Carey (actress) (born 1980), pornographic actress
Mary Virginia Carey, English/American writer
Mary Cary may refer to:

Mary Cary (prophetess) (c. 1621–1663), English prophet and writer during the English Civil War
Mary Ann Shadd (1823–1893), married name Cary, pioneering educator, newspaper publisher, abolitionist and suffragist
Mary Flagler Cary (1901–1967), American philanthropist
Mary Cary, bestselling 1910 novel by Kate Langley Bosher

See also
Mariah Carey, American singer-songwriter and actress